tRNA pseudouridine31 synthase (Pus6p) is an enzyme with systematic name tRNA-uridine31 uracil mutase. This enzyme catalyses the following chemical reaction

 tRNA uridine31  tRNA pseudouridine31

The enzyme specifically acts on uridine31 in tRNA.

References

External links 
 

EC 5.4.99